Leratiomyces erythrocephalus, commonly known as the red pouch fungus, is a species of fungus in the family Strophariaceae. First described scientifically as Secotium erythrocephalum by Louis René Tulasne in 1845 and later transferred to Weraroa by American mycologists Rolf Singer and Alexander H. Smith in 1958, it was given its current name in 2008. It is found in New Zealand.

References

External links

 

Strophariaceae
Fungi of New Zealand
Secotioid fungi